Denair High School is a public high school located in Denair, California founded in 1912.

Statistics 
The school has an enrollment of 276 children enrolled in grades 9 to 12. 8.3% of all students are English language learners and 57.6% of students receive free or reduced lunch.

Demographics 
2016-17

References 

Educational institutions established in 1912
Public high schools in California
High schools in Stanislaus County, California
1912 establishments in California